The Banjarmasin War (in old spelling Bandjermasin War, Dutch: Bandjermasinse Oorlog, or formally Expeditie naar de Zuider- en Oosterafdeling van Borneo) (1859–1863) was a war of succession in the Sultanate of Banjarmasin, as well as a colonial war for the restoration of Dutch authority in the eastern and southern section of Borneo.

Background

17th century
Since 1606 the East United India Company maintained contacts with the island of Borneo. In  1635 the first contract was signed with the Sultanate of Banjarmasin for the provision of pepper - at the time, a luxury product in Europe and a major reason for the Dutch interest in this region.

In following decades there were several skirmishes and armed clashes, especially related to such pepper contracts being unfulfilled. One of the most serious was the 1638 killing of 64 Dutch and 21 of their Japanese partners, at Kota Waring in Bandjermasin.

Early 19th century
In 1809 Herman Willem Daendels, then governor of the Dutch East Indies, decided to abandon Bandjermasin, as maintaining a presence there was considered uneconomical. However, in 1811 the British, who took over the islands in the context of the Napoleonic wars, established a presence there, notably in Alexander Hare who established an independent state of Maluka on the S.Maluka river which runs into the Java Sea not far S.E. of the Barito.

In December 1816, British authority returned to the Dutch, who signed a new contract with the Sultan. Though he continued to reign, in January 1817 the Sultan's flag was replaced by the Dutch one. Effective power in the Sultanate was increasingly taken up by the Dutch Resident.

Following years were marked by multiple small revolts, and by further unequal contracts being signed.

Succession crisis 

In 1852 the Sultan's heir-apparent died, and the Dutch replaced him by the illegitimate grandson Tamjied Illah. 

In vain, Sultan Adam and many nobles in 1853 sent an emissary to Batavia, pointing out iniquities perpetrated by the Dutch-designated heir and appealing for the Dutch to recognise instead Hidayat, a younger but legitimate son. In his testament, probably written in late 1853 or early 1855, Sultan Adam appointed Hidayat as his successor, and that anyone who failed to respect his wished was to be put to death. The Dutch Indies Government continued to reject Hidayat's nomination, however, offering him the position of governor instead. In this impasse, a brother of the deceased heir-apparent, Prabu Anom, proclaimed himself the new sultan in Martapura in 1855, asserting that he was now a better candidate than the other two. The Government responded by sending a warship to Martapura in 1856, demanding Adam in a letter to respect the contract, the choice of governor, providing Tamjid with an act of recognition as successor, and imprisoning his rival Prabu Anom. Under this pressure, Adam agreed to name Tamjid his successor and support Hidayat's nomination for the governorship.

Sultan Adam died in November 1857 and was succeeded by Tamjid, formally installed by the Dutch resident van Bentheim in Martapura without incident. However, when he tried to hold a meeting with (the earlier released) Prabu Anom, he escaped. Van Bentheim ordered Hidayat to extradite Prabu Anom within 8 days, and after some hesitation, Hidayat complied when he was given assurances his uncle would retain his freedom. Nevertheless, the Government broke its promise, arrested and banished Prabu Anom to Java. In protest, Hidayat asked to resign as governor, but was refused. During the year 1858, Tamjid and Hidayat appear to have cooperated in their opposition to the Dutch Indies Government, but due to mutual mistrust, their collaboration was ineffective.

War 
A struggle for power ensued between Tamjid and Hidayat, which divided the population. In early 1859, a revolt broke out east of Martapura, and Hidayat was sent to quell it. He acquired a document, signed and sealed by Tamjid, which urged the rebels to 'wreak mischief in a manner that people will think it was caused by the governor.' Hidayat was furious at Tamjid, resigned as governor and retired from politics. Tamjid then informed him he and his supporters would be punished for insubordination by troops and steamships provided by the Dutch. Colonel Augustus Johannes Andresen landed his forces on Borneo at the end of April 1859, and on 29 April 1859 assumed military command at Bandjermasin. On 1 May he suspended the Resident and himself took up civil administration as well.

Massacre of Europeans 
On 1 May 1859, all the Europeans at the Julia Hermina coal mine at Kalangan were murdered, as were all at the missionary settlement near Poctor Petak. At the mine, Englishman James Motley, his wife, and three children, all died. Hidayat responded with loyalty to the Dutch: he was the first to alarm the Government of what had happened during the attack on the Pengaron mining complex three days earlier and the further attack plans of the rebels; when the mining complex at Kalangan was assaulted on 1 May, he tracked down the women and children who survived the attack and put them under protection in Bandjermasin, and he helped organise the defence.

Abdication and sultanate's abolition 
Tamjid abdicated the throne in June 1859 when he felt unable to continue his reign any longer amidst the escalating rebellion. After a thorough inquiry, Andresen trusted Hidayat completely, and pleaded with him to come to Bandjermasin to become the new sultan. However, Hidayat was unable to trust Andresen in return, hesitating to act on the latter's repeated requests to take the crown. Meanwhile, the Government in Batavia was dissatisfied with Andresen's policies and recalled him in October 1859.

While fighting the rebels, the Dutch Indies Government declared Hidayat a renegade and stripped him of his gubernatorial position. Seeing no other candidate to succeed Tamjid, the Dutch abolished the Sultanate of Bandjermasin in its entirety, and put the territory under direct control of Batavia. There is little evidence to suggest Hidayat himself ever took part in the rebellion against the Dutch Government, although it was often said to have been fought in his name. After wandering from place to place, Hidayat surrendered himself to the Dutch in early 1862; he was given a house in Cianjur (Dutch: Tjandjoer) in West Java and a monthly subsidy of 1,000 guilders by the Dutch Indies Government, leading a peaceful life to the end of his days.

Antasari versus Verspyck 
Meanwhile, Prince Antasari and his rebels continued their revolt for three more years. As a distant descendant of a previous ruler, Antasari sought to restore the sultanate and reign over Banjar himself. However, Dutch major Govert Verspyck proved to be capable commander and managed to achieve a series of victories over the prince's forces. An outbreak of smallpox led to Antasari's death on 11 October 1862.

Aftermath 
The war ended with a Dutch victory in 1863. Occasional sporadic fighting continued until 1905.

Notes

References

Further reading
 1936. Dr. J. Eisenberger. Kroniek der Zuider -en Oosterafdeling van Borneo. Liem Hwat Sing, Bandjermasin.
 1892. Egbert Broer Kielstra. De ondergang van het Bandjermasinse Rijk. Overdruk uit de Indische Gids, jaargang 1891. E.J. Brill. Leiden.
 1859. Wolter Robert van Hoëvell. De expeditie tegen Boni en de ramoen van Bandjermasin. Tijdschrift voor Nederlands Indie. 21 ste jaargang
 1886. H.G.J.L. Meyners Bijdragen tot de geschiedenis van het Bandjermasinsche Rijk. 1863-1866. E.J. Brill. Leiden
 1865. Willem Adriaan van Rees. De Bandjermasinse Krijg. 1859-1863. Twee delen. D.A. Thieme. Arnhem.
 1867. W.A. van Rees. De Bandjermasinsche Krijg van 1859-1863 nader toegelicht. D.A. Thieme. Arnhem.
 1897. J.P. Schoemaker. Verhalen uit de grote en kleine oorlog in Nederlands Indië. W.P. van Stockum & Zoon. Den Haag.

Wars involving the Netherlands
Wars involving Indonesia
Banjarmasin
Indonesia–Netherlands relations
Dutch conquest of Indonesia
History of Borneo